Bussie is a surname. Notable people with the surname include:

Asya Bussie (born 1991), American basketball player
Landon Bussie (born  1988), American basketball coach

See also
Bussi
Busse